The 1999 Dallas Burn season was the fourth season of the Major League Soccer team. The team made the playoffs for the fourth consecutive year.

Final standings

Western Conference

Overall Table

Regular season

Playoffs

Western Conference semifinals

Western Conference finals

U.S. Open Cup

References

External links
 Season statistics

1999
Dallas Burn
Dallas Burn
Dallas Burn